Tunahan is a surname and given name. Notable people with the name include:

Süleyman Hilmi Tunahan (1888–1959), Ottoman Islamic scholar
Tunahan Cicek (born 1992), Swiss footballer
Tunahan Kuzu (born 1981), Turkish-Dutch politician
Tunahan Taşçı (born 2002), Dutch footballer